Filippenkovo is a rural locality (a selo) and the administrative center of Filippenkovskoye Rural Settlement, Buturlinovsky District, Voronezh Oblast, Russia. The population was 915 as of 2010. There are 8 streets.

Geography 
Filippenkovo is located 18 km southeast of Buturlinovka (the district's administrative centre) by road. Masychevo is the nearest rural locality.

References 

Rural localities in Buturlinovsky District